This was the first edition of the tournament.

Enzo Couacaud won the title after defeating Steven Diez 7–6(7–5), 7–6(7–3) in the final.

Seeds

Draw

Finals

Top half

Bottom half

References

External links
Main draw
Qualifying draw

Gran Canaria Challenger - 1